Aleksey Vitalyevich Yevseyev (born 30 March 1994) is a Russian footballer who plays as an attacking midfielder or central midfielder for FC Ufa on loan from FC Ural Yekaterinburg.

Club career
He made his debut in the Russian Premier League on 22 July 2012 for FC Zenit Saint Petersburg in a game against FC Amkar Perm.

On 25 December 2018, he left FC Ural Yekaterinburg by mutual consent. On 22 February 2019, he signed with FC Khimki.

On 25 August 2020, he returned to Ural. On 14 February 2022, Yevseyev extended his contract with Ural until the end of the 2022–23 season. On 8 September 2022, Yevseyev was loaned to FC Ufa.

Career statistics

Club

Honours

Individual 
CIS Cup top goalscorer: 2015

References

External links
 
 

1994 births
Footballers from Saint Petersburg
Living people
Russian footballers
Russia youth international footballers
Russia under-21 international footballers
Association football midfielders
FC Zenit Saint Petersburg players
FC Zenit-2 Saint Petersburg players
FC Ural Yekaterinburg players
FC Khimki players
FC Rotor Volgograd players
FC Fakel Voronezh players
FC Ufa players
Russian Premier League players
Russian First League players
Russian Second League players